The Beerhouse Act 1840 (3 & 4 Vict c 61) was an Act of the Parliament of the United Kingdom. It was one of the Licensing Acts 1828 to 1886. It was the third Beerhouse Act. It was passed to amend the Beerhouse Act 1830 (1 Will 4 c 64) and the Beerhouse Act 1834 (4 & 5 Will 4 c 85). The change in the law made it necessary for persons to have continued residence within the building that they were intending to use after an application for the issuing of a licence for the selling of  alcohol, and that they be in possession of the deeds of ownership of the building.

The Act became necessary to control the development of civil disorder (national evil) caused by those involved in activities resulting from the  vice of intoxication, specifically of the people within the class of labouring workers in ale houses so that in 1834 a select committee was created to investigate in order that measures of legislature might be created to limit this.

References
John Mounteney Lely. "The Beerhouse Act, 1840". The Statutes of Practical Utility. (Chitty's Statutes). Fifth Edition. Sweet and Maxwell. Stevens and Sons. Chancery Lane, London. 1894. Volume 5. Title "Intoxicating Liquors". Pages 34 to 38.

External links 
Great Britain. Supreme Court of Judicature, Great Britain. Parliament. House of Lords, Great Britain. Privy Council  google.co.uk The Weekly reporter, Volume 47 Wildy & Sons, 1899.

United Kingdom Acts of Parliament 1840
Alcohol law in the United Kingdom